Mesophleps is a genus of moths in the family Gelechiidae. The genus was erected by Jacob Hübner in 1825.

Species
albilinella species group
Mesophleps albilinella
Mesophleps aspina
Mesophleps coffeae
Mesophleps nairobiensis
Mesophleps parvella
geodes species group
Mesophleps catericta
Mesophleps geodes
gigantella species group
Mesophleps gigantella
palpigera species group
Mesophleps acutunca
Mesophleps adustipennis
Mesophleps bifidella
Mesophleps corsicella
Mesophleps crocina
Mesophleps epiochra
Mesophleps ioloncha
Mesophleps oxycedrella
Mesophleps palpigera
Mesophleps safranella
Mesophleps silacella
Mesophleps sublutiana
Mesophleps tabellata
tephrastis species group
Mesophleps apentheta
Mesophleps argonota
Mesophleps chloranthes
Mesophleps cycnobathra
Mesophleps macrosemus
Mesophleps meliphanes
Mesophleps mylicotis
Mesophleps ochroloma
Mesophleps tephrastis
Mesophleps tetrachroa
Mesophleps trichombra
trinotella species group
Mesophleps ochracella
Mesophleps trinotella
Mesophleps unguella
truncatella species group
Mesophleps truncatella
Mesophleps undulatella

Associated species
The following species were described in Mesophleps or at one time associated with it or one of its generic synonyms:
Agonochaetia impunctella (Caradja, 1920)
Anarsia centrospila Turner, 1919
Aponoea obtusipalpis Walsingham, 1905
Dichomeris aprica (Meyrick, 1913)
Dichomeris sciritis (Meyrick, 1918)
Megacraspedus arnaldi (Turati & Krüger, 1930)
Nothris mesophracta Turner, 1919
Pycnobathra acromelas (Turner, 1919)
Sarotorna mesoleuca (Lower, 1900)

References

 , 2012: A taxonomic revision of the genus Mesophleps Hübner, 1825 (Lepidoptera: Gelechiidae). Zootaxa 3373: 1-82.
 , 2011: Description de Mesophleps gallicelle n. sp. et première citation dHyperlais cruzae du sud de la France (Lepidoptera: Gelechiidae: Anacampsini et Crambidae). Revue de l'Association Roussillonnaise d'Entomologie'' 20 (2)''': 56-58.

 
Anacampsini